Hibbertia scabra is a species of flowering plant in the family Dilleniaceae and is endemic to the north of the Northern Territory. It is a small shrub with hairy foliage, linear to narrow elliptical leaves and yellow flowers arranged singly near the ends of branches with about fifty stamens arranged around two densely scaly carpels.

Description
Flowering occurs from March to April.

Taxonomy
Hibbertia scabra was first formally described in 1863 by George Bentham in Flora Australiensis from specimens collected by Robert Brown (botanist, born 1773) on the north coast of Northern Australia. The specific epithet (scabra) means "rough".

Distribution and habitat
This hibbertia grows in woodland in a few locations in northern Arnhem Land in the Northern Territory.

Conservation status
Hibbertia scabra is classified as "near threatened" under the Territory Parks and Wildlife Conservation Act 1976.

See also
List of Hibbertia species

References

scabra
Flora of the Northern Territory
Plants described in 2010
Taxa named by Hellmut R. Toelken